Lorena, Light-Footed Woman is a 2019 documentary film directed by Juan Carlos Rulfo and starring Lorena Ramirez, Mario Ramírez and Santiago Ramírez. The premise revolves around Lorena, a long-distance runner from Mexico.

Cast 
 Lorena Ramirez
 Mario Ramírez
 Santiago Ramírez
 Juana Ramírez
 Talina Ramírez
 Diego Ramírez
 Yolanda Ramírez
 Rubén Ramírez
 María de Jesús Hernández

Release
Lorena, Light-Footed Woman was released on November 20, 2019, on Netflix.

References

External links

 
 

2019 documentary films
2019 films
Tarahumara-language films
Netflix original documentary films
Documentary films about sportspeople